Events from the year 1972 in Austria.

Incumbents
 President: Franz Jonas 
 Chancellor: Bruno Kreisky

Governors
 Burgenland: Theodor Kery 
 Carinthia: Hans Sima 
 Lower Austria: Andreas Maurer 
 Salzburg: Hans Lechner 
 Styria: Friedrich Niederl 
 Tyrol: Eduard Wallnöfer
 Upper Austria: Erwin Wenzl
 Vienna: Felix Slavik 
 Vorarlberg: Herbert Keßler

Events
 1 January – Future President of Austria Kurt Waldheim becomes Secretary-General of the United Nations.

Births
 12 January – Toto Wolff, racing driver
 29 November – Andreas Goldberger, ski jumper
 7 December – Hermann Maier, Alpine ski racer

Deaths
 12 June:  Ludwig von Bertalanffy, biologist (b. 1901)
 13 June:  Stephanie von Hohenlohe, spy for Germany in World War II spy (b. 1891)
 31 July:  Alfons Gorbach,  15th Chancellor of Austria (b. 1898)
 30 November: Hans Erich Apostel, composer (b. 1901)
 13 December:  Gustav Schwarzenegger, police officer, father of Arnold Schwarzenegger (b. 1907)

References

 
1970s in Austria